Selenopidae, also called wall crab spiders, wall spiders and flatties, is a family of araneomorph spiders first described by Eugène Simon in 1897. It contains over 280 species in nine genera, of which Selenops is the most well-known. This family is just one of several families whose English name includes the phrase "crab spider". These spiders are often called "Flatties" due to their flattened dorsal profile. The Afrikaans name for these spiders is "Muurspinnekop."

They are a variety of colors, including shades of grey, brown, yellow, and orange, with darker markings on the cephalothorax and spots or mottling on the abdomen, and annulations on the legs of most species. They are very flat dorsoventrally, and have two tarsal claws and laterigrade legs. Their running and striking speeds place them among the world’s fastest animals, making them difficult to capture, while their coloring often makes them difficult to see. Their spin is the fastest leg-driven turning maneuver of any terrestrial animal, being able to strike their prey in an eighth of a second (three times the speed of a blink); therefore, the spiders' spins are being used by researchers in robotics applications. Dr. Zeng of UC Merced claims that the flattie spiders' "outward stance," which "tracks parallel to the ground" allows them to spin rapidly, giving them a "wider range of unrestricted motion." Each of their legs face a different direction. Like most other Entelegynae, they have eight eyes arranged in two rows; one with six and one with two.

They are commonly found on walls or under rocks. Selenops is the most widely distributed and Anyphops is found throughout Sub-Saharan Africa. The remaining genera have more specific distributions. At least one (possibly extinct) species of Garcorops, G. jadis, is known only from subfossil copal.

Genera

, the World Spider Catalog accepts the following genera:

Amamanganops Crews & Harvey, 2011 — Philippines
Anyphops Benoit, 1968 — Africa
Garcorops Corronca, 2003 — Comoros, Madagascar
Godumops Crews & Harvey, 2011 — Papua New Guinea
Hovops Benoit, 1968 — Madagascar
Karaops Crews & Harvey, 2011 — Australia
Makdiops Crews & Harvey, 2011 — India, Nepal
Selenops Latreille, 1819 — Asia, North America, Caribbean, South America, Africa, Central America
Siamspinops Dankittipakul & Corronca, 2009 — Malaysia, Thailand, Taiwan

See also
 List of Selenopidae species

References

External links

 
Araneomorphae families